Hanne Rømer  (born July 29, 1949) is a Danish composer, musician and singer. She also teaches and conducts.

In 1975, she created the rock group Hos Anna together with her sister Lotte Rømer as well as  Karen Mortensen, Irene Becker og Bente Dichmann. The group performed frequently at Vallekilde Højskole until it was dissolved in 1980. Rømer was also a member of the women's band Hexehyl which started in 1978.

See also
List of Danish composers

References

External links
 Amanda-Music
 Hanne Rømer / Mads Granum Quartet

Danish composers
1949 births
Living people
People from Hvidovre Municipality
Danish women composers